Ryes is an unincorporated community located along old U.S. Route 421 in the Upper Little River Township of Harnett County, North Carolina,  United 
It is a part of the Dunn Micropolitan Area, which is also a part of the greater Raleigh–Durham–Cary Combined Statistical Area (CSA) as defined by the United States Census Bureau.

Camels Creek, a tributary of the Cape Fear River, rises just north of Ryes.

References
 

Unincorporated communities in Harnett County, North Carolina
Unincorporated communities in North Carolina